Charles Adler (born August 25, 1954) is a Hungarian-Canadian writer/broadcaster and political commentator, most noted as a former host of the newsmagazine series Global Sunday and as host of the syndicated radio talk show Charles Adler Tonight on the Global News radio network from 2016 until 2021.

Life and career

Adler grew up in Montreal, where he started his broadcast career while attending McGill University. After a stint at Radio McGill, he became a producer at CKGM in Montreal in the summer of 1973. His first professional radio job as an on-air personality began in 1974, when he hosted a weeknight rock show at CKXL in Calgary. Within the year he was back in Montreal working at CJAD, followed by work at stations in Hamilton, London, Winnipeg and Toronto. He returned to Calgary in 1989 to launch a talk radio show called Hot Talk. He followed that with a move to the USA that saw him host a nationally syndicated radio show out of Tampa that hit more than 120 markets.

In 1994, he launched a television show called Adler on Line in Boston which a year later earned Adler an Emmy Award for Best Host in New England. 1996 saw him returning to Canada to host the Charles Adler Show in Toronto on CFRB. Two years later he was back in Western Canada, hosting Adler on Line on CJOB in Winnipeg. In 2001, Adler was the debut host on Global Sunday, a national Sunday night TV show. Along with numerous appearances on Canadian news and current affairs shows, Adler has also guest hosted in the USA on the Fox News Channel.

In 2004, Corus Radio launched Adler as a national host of Charles Adler which aired on 14 radio stations for more than eight years. In 2011, he began to host a self-titled daily talk series on the Sun News Network that aired weeknights at 8:00 and 11:00 (et) and ran until September 2013. Adler returned to hosting a daily talk show on 680 CJOB in Winnipeg and was heard on weekends on 630 CHED in Edmonton and Newstalk 770 in Calgary. Adler announced on July 30, 2015, that after 17 years he was leaving CJOB effective August 7, 2015. Adler moved to Vancouver, British Columbia in order to be closer to his family. On October 13, 2015, The Charles Adler Show launched on SiriusXM and aired until November 21, 2016.

In November 2016 Corus re-launched Adler as a network show. Charles Adler Tonight is based at Global News Radio 980 CKNW in Vancouver where the show airs weeknights. The show is also heard on Global News Radio 770 CHQR in Calgary, 630 CHED in Edmonton, in Winnipeg at 680 CJOB, CFMJ AM640 in Toronto, and CFPL AM980 in London. The show ran for five years until concluding in September 2021.

Adler received a Lifetime Achievement Award from the Radio Television Digital News Association on May 27, 2017.

Political views

Adler has self identified as a conservative for much of his broadcast career, and has even been described in media as "the closest Canada ever came to having its own Rush Limbaugh",

References

1954 births
Living people
Canadian radio journalists
Canadian talk radio hosts
Canadian television news anchors
Hungarian emigrants to Canada
McGill University alumni
Conservatism in Canada